The 2019 Nigerian Senate election in Sokoto State was held on February 23, 2019, to elect members of the Nigerian Senate to represent Sokoto State. Aliyu Magatakarda Wamakko representing Sokoto North, Shehu Abubakar Tambuwal representing Sokoto South and Abdullahi Ibrahim Gobir representing Sokoto East all won on the platform of All Progressives Congress. But the Court of Appeal Sokoto Division on 30 October 2019 sacked Shehu Abubakar Tambuwal representing Sokoto South on the platform of All Progressives Congress. Ibrahim Abdullahi Danbaba on the platform of Peoples Democratic Party replaced the sacked senator.

Overview

Summary

Results

Sokoto North 
A total of 39 candidates registered with the Independent National Electoral Commission to contest in the election. APC candidate Aliyu Magatakarda Wamakko won the election, defeating PDP Ahmed Muhammad Maccido and 37 other party candidates.

Sokoto South 
A total of 31 candidates registered with the Independent National Electoral Commission to contest in the election. APC candidate Shehu Abubakar Tambuwal won the election, defeating PDP Ibrahim Abdullahi Danbaba and 29 other party candidate. But the Court of Appeal Sokoto Division sacked the APC candidate and replaced him with the PDP candidate as the rightful winner.

Sokoto East 
A total of 32 candidates registered with the Independent National Electoral Commission to contest in the election. APC candidate Abdullahi Ibrahim Gobir won the election, defeating PDP Maidaji Salihu and 30 other party candidate.

References 

Sokoto State senatorial elections